Heartland Men’s Chorus (HMC) is a gay men’s chorus located in Kansas City. Founded in 1986, and currently featuring more than 150 singing members, HMC performs an annual concert series to live audiences in excess of 6,700 at its performance home, the Folly Theater. In addition to its subscription concert series, HMC regularly performs community outreach, reaching an estimated 8,000 additional audience members. The Chorus is a 501(c)(3) not-for-profit organization and, as a performing force, is the largest men’s chorus in the region. In terms of infrastructure and budget, HMC is the largest community chorus in the region. HMC is also the oldest cultural institution serving the LGBT community in the region.

Early years 

In 1986, a small group of men had a dream of forming a choral group in Kansas City. After much discussion and planning, their efforts led to the formation of the Chorus, which had its debut concert on December 14 of that year. The first concert, featuring 30 men, was dedicated to the memory of their friend Brian McLothlin.

Performance Highlights 

Over the years, the Chorus has reached out by performing in a host of area venues, singing in churches, theaters, nightclubs, parks and union halls. The Chorus has sung for the opening gala of a traveling exhibit of the Smithsonian Institution and a national signature event of the Lewis and Clark Expedition bicentennial, A Journey Fourth.
In order to reach beyond the Greater Kansas City area, the Chorus has performed elsewhere in the two-state area including Columbia, Joplin, Springfield and Maryville in Missouri and in Baldwin City, Lawrence, Topeka, and Wichita in Kansas.
Outside the two-state area, the Chorus has sung with GALA member choruses at their home sites of St. Louis, Chicago, Washington, D.C., and Dallas. In 2002, an international tour took members to London, Paris and Hamburg, Germany, where they shared the stage with other GALA Choruses.
In addition, the Chorus has performed at five quadrennial festivals of GALA Choruses. Festival experiences have allowed the Chorus to perform in Denver, CO; Tampa, FL; San Jose, CA; Montreal, Quebec, Canada, and most recently Miami, FL for GALA Festival 2008.
The Chorus has reached out through Martin Luther King Day observances, Harmony in a World of Difference events and AIDS awareness events. The Chorus joined with the Women's Chorus of Dallas to present Sing for the Cure, a benefit that raised $12,000 for Susan G. Komen for the Cure.
In recent years, the Chorus has presented two family matinee concerts, featuring pieces based on works by internationally renowned children's author Tomie DePaola. In 2003, the Chorus performed on the Folly Theater Children's Series, presenting music to two sold-out houses of school children.
Since 1994, the Chorus has produced nine CDs, as well as two DVDs of concert events: The Few, the Proud, featuring Col. Margarethe Cammermeyer as narrator, and All God's Children, featuring the Rev. Dr. Mel White of Soulforce as narrator.

Commissioned works 

Since 2002 alone, the Chorus has commissioned three major works: Two Flutes Playing, by Kansas City composer Mark Hayes, a major work featuring orchestra and dance; and Country Angel Christmas, based on a children's book by Tomie DePaola. In 2005, the Chorus joined with the Gay Men's Chorus of Los Angeles to co-commission Life is a Cabaret, a concert tribute to the songwriting team of John Kander and Fred Ebb.
In addition, the Chorus joined with other GALA Choruses in commissioning Oliver Button is a Sissy, a half-hour musical based on another book by DePaola. The Chorus also has commissioned several song arrangements, featuring the talents of Eric Lane Barnes, Mark Hayes, Scott Farthing, and Paul Siskind.

Leadership 

The first conductor of the Chorus was Father Ambrose Karels, followed by co-directors Rande Stewart and Stephen Johnson.
The late Gina Scaggs Epifano was the first paid director of the Chorus. Among GALA Chorus directors, she was one of the first women to conduct a men's chorus.
She was followed by Reuben Reynolds III, who directed the Chorus from 1990 to 1998. In his tenure, the Chorus moved to the Folly Theater as its performance home and broadened its scope and reach.
It was under his leadership that in 1998 the Chorus received the GLAAD (Gay and Lesbian Alliance Against Defamation) Award for its outstanding achievements as an arts organization and for its highly visible presence in the Kansas City gay and lesbian community.
From 1998 to 2013, the Chorus was under the direction of artistic director Dr. Joseph P. Nadeau. Under his leadership, the Chorus has expanded its number of subscription performances and performed at the national conference of the American Choral Directors Association. Dustin S. Cates was named the new artistic director beginning with the 2014-2015 season. Shawn Cullen was appointed Interim artistic director for the 2019-2020 season and named permanent artistic director in 2020. 
Rick Fisher, who became executive director in 1997, is responsible for day-to-day operation, a task in which he is assisted by the fifth section, HeartLight, a group of volunteers that provides behind-the-scenes work and support for the Chorus.
On the official level, the Board of Directors and its committees (Development, Finance, Human Resources, Board Development, Membership Services, and GALA Fund-raising) make decisions for the long-range development of the Chorus.http://hmckc.org/History

Discography 
 Freedom (2010)
 Quest Unending (2008)
 A New December (2005)
 Heartland Pride (2004)
 Let Heaven and Nature Swing (2003)
 Two Flutes Playing (2002)
 Voices from the Heart (2002)
 A Kansas City Legacy (2000)
 With Love from the Heartland (1998)
 A Song for Christmas (1994, reissued 2005)

Affiliations 
American Choral Directors Association (ACDA)
Chorus America
GALA Choruses (Gay and Lesbian Association of Choruses)

Notes and references

External links 
 Heartland Men's Chorus Official website
 GALA Choruses, Inc. Official website

American choirs
Gay men's choruses
Gay culture in the United States
Musical groups established in 1986
1986 establishments in Missouri